Súni Fríði Barbá Johannesen (born 20 October 1972) is a retired Faroese football striker and later manager. He became Faroese league top goalscorer in 1995 and 2000.

References

1972 births
Living people
Faroese footballers
NSÍ Runavík players
B68 Toftir players
Havnar Bóltfelag players
GÍ Gøta players
Argja Bóltfelag players
07 Vestur players
FC Hoyvík players
Miðvágs Bóltfelag players
Association football forwards
Faroe Islands international footballers
Faroese football managers